Extreme Love may refer to:
 "Extreme Love", a song by Holly Herndon from her 2019 album Proto
 Extreme Love: Autism, a 2012 documentary by Louis Theroux
 Extreme Love: Dementia, a 2012 documentary by Louis Theroux
 Extreme Love, a 2018 unscripted TV series on We TV channel

See also
 A Love Extreme, the first studio album by musician Benji Hughes